"What My Baby Needs Is a Little More Lovin'" is a song recorded as a duet between James Brown and Lyn Collins. Released as a single in December 1972, it charted #17 R&B and #56 Pop. The song was arranged by Fred Wesley and Dave Matthews.

References

External links
 AllMusic review

James Brown songs
Lyn Collins songs
Songs written by James Brown
1972 singles
Male–female vocal duets
Songs written by David Matthews (keyboardist)
Songs written by Lyn Collins
1972 songs
Polydor Records singles